CBC Docs POV is a Canadian television point-of-view documentary series, which airs on CBC Television. The series premiered in fall 2015 under the title Firsthand, replacing Doc Zone, after the CBC discontinued its internal documentary production unit, and was renamed CBC Docs POV in 2017. The series airs one documentary film each week, commissioned from external producers rather than being produced directly by the CBC; some, but not all, films screened as part of the series have also had longer versions separately released as theatrical feature documentaries.

Repeat airings of the series have also sometimes included films which were originally broadcast as part of Doc Zone.

The CBC announced in 2021 that it would not commission further documentaries under the CBC Docs POV brand, instead merging all documentary broadcasts into The Passionate Eye.

Episodes

Firsthand, Season 1

Firsthand, Season 2

CBC Docs POV, Season 1

CBC Docs POV, Season 2

CBC Docs POV, Season 3

CBC Docs POV, Season 4

CBC Docs POV, Season 5

References

External links
 
 

CBC Television original programming
2015 Canadian television series debuts
2021 Canadian television series endings
2010s Canadian documentary television series
2020s Canadian documentary television series